Nicola Thost (born 3 May 1977) is a German snowboarder and Olympic champion. She won a gold medal at the 1998 Winter Olympics in Nagano.

References

External links

1977 births
Living people
German female snowboarders
Olympic snowboarders of Germany
Snowboarders at the 1998 Winter Olympics
Snowboarders at the 2002 Winter Olympics
Olympic gold medalists for Germany
Olympic medalists in snowboarding
Medalists at the 1998 Winter Olympics
20th-century German women
21st-century German women